The Videophone Inspection Program (VIP) is a U.S. Customs and Border Protection program that enables boaters entering the United States from Canada to be inspected face-to-face by a CBP inspector upon arrival at a selected reporting station.  The program was designed to facilitate the legal entry of pleasure boats into the United States that had not been issued a Form I-68.

History 

In June 1997, the US Immigration and Naturalization Service (INS) was mandated by Congress to design, develop and deploy a series of videophone inspection stations at four specific marinas along the US-Canada border in time for the 1997 boating season.  In support of the INS, The US Department Of Transportation's Volpe Center designed and developed a weatherproof videophone system using commercially available components.  The systems were first deployed in Morristown, Waddington, Ogdensburg and Clayton, New York, with installation completed on July 3, 1997.

The videophone system uses a video transceiver developed by 8x8 and is housed within a Gaitronics weatherproof housing.  Commercially available video screens and other electronic components are also used.

In 1998, the INS directed its contractor Electronic Data Systems to develop another videophone system.  This system was called the Outlying Area Reporting Station (OARS), and it was installed on the shores of Grand Lake in Orient, Maine.  It features a card-reading unit and amplified speakerphone audio, but the video transmission is only one-way.  This design was not deployed elsewhere; however, the OARS name is sometimes used to describe the current overall videophone program.

From 1998 to 1999 the INS decided to expand the deployment of their VIP system, and by the end of 1999 the system was deployed at the following 33 locations:

Current status 

Customs and Border Protection continues to operate and maintain the Videophone Inspection Program, mostly at the same locations.  The systems at Angle Inlet are also used to inspect motor vehicles passengers arriving from Canada because there is no port of entry at the border.  

Today videophones can be found at or near most of the original deployment locations.  Other locations have been added over the years, including Dunkirk, Sodus Point, Point Breeze, New York and Rochester, New York and Mackinac Island.   The design has changed little from the original rapid prototypes of 1997.

References 

Borders of the United States
Videotelephony